Grave New World is the fourth studio album by English band Strawbs, their fifth overall. It was the first album to be released after the departure of Rick Wakeman, who was replaced by Blue Weaver, late of Amen Corner.

Background
	
Tony Visconti influenced Cousins to buy an I Ching book; Cousins used the book to decide what he should do after Wakeman had left the band. The answer was used in the lyrics for the first track on the album, "Benedictus". The songs themselves show the continuation of the movement away from Strawbs' original folk leanings. Founding member Tony Hooper began to be increasingly uncomfortable with this and left after the recording sessions of this album.

The original vinyl album had lavish artwork and included a pamphlet showing the lyrics of each track together with details of instrumentation. The front cover is a reproduction of William Blake's Glad Day.

The album reached number 11 in the UK Albums Chart.

Track listing
Side one
"Benedictus" (Dave Cousins) – 4:24
"Hey Little Man ... Thursday's Child" (Cousins) – 1:06
"Queen of Dreams" (Cousins) – 5:32
"Heavy Disguise" (John Ford) – 2:53
"New World" (Cousins) – 4:11
"Hey Little Man ... Wednesday's Child" (Cousins) – 1:06

Side two
"The Flower and the Young Man" (Cousins) – 4:17
"Tomorrow" (Cousins, Tony Hooper, Ford, Blue Weaver, Richard Hudson) – 4:49
"On Growing Older" (Cousins) – 1:56
"Ah Me, Ah My" (Hooper) – 1:24
"Is It Today, Lord?" (Hudson) – 3:07
"The Journey's End" (Cousins, Weaver) – 1:46

Bonus tracks -  A&M 1998 reissue CD
"Here it Comes" (Cousins) – 2:42
"I'm Going Home" (Cousins) – 3:14

"I'm Going Home" originally appeared on Dave Cousins's solo album Two Weeks Last Summer. This track is the first occasion on which Dave Lambert recorded with the band. He had occasionally been appearing on stage for encores, but after this album and the departure of Tony Hooper, Lambert joined the band full-time.

Personnel
Strawbs
Dave Cousins – lead vocals, backing vocals, acoustic guitar, electric guitar, dulcimer, recorder
Tony Hooper – lead vocals, backing vocals, acoustic guitar, autoharp, tambourine
Blue Weaver – organ, piano, harmonium, mellotron, clavioline on The Flower and the Young Man
John Ford – lead vocals, backing vocals, bass guitar, acoustic guitar
Richard Hudson – backing vocals, drums, sitar, tablas

Additional personnel
Trevor Lucas, Anne Collins – backing vocals on "Benedictus"
Robert Kirby - arranger ("Heavy Disguise")
Tony Visconti - arranger ("Ah Me, Ah My")

The track "Ah Me, Ah, My" credits "The Gentlemen of the Chorus" with vocals and "Tony Visconti's Old Tyme Dance Orchestra" (actually the Ted Heath Orchestra) as musicians.

Recording
Recorded mainly at Morgan Studios, London with additional work at Island Studios and Landsdowne Studios.

Produced by Dave Cousins, Richard Hudson, John Ford, Blue Weaver and Tony Hooper

Tom Allom – engineer at Morgan Studios
Martin Levan – assistant engineer
Frank Owen – engineer at Island Studios
John Mackswith – engineer at Landsdowne Studios
Tony Visconti – producer, "Benedictus"
Gus Dudgeon – original producer, "Ah Me, Ah My"

Charts

Release history

References
Grave New World on Strawbsweb
30th anniversary article on Strawbsweb
Sleeve notes CD 540,934-2 Grave New World

Notes

Strawbs albums
1972 albums
Albums arranged by Robert Kirby
Albums arranged by Tony Visconti
A&M Records albums

fi:Grave New World